Archaeorhizomycetes is a class of fungi in the subdivision Taphrinomycotina of the Ascomycota. So far, the class has only one described order, Archaeorhizomycetales, family, Archaeorhizomycetaceae, and genus, Archaeorhizomyces. The class was first described by a team led by Anna Rosling in 2011. Species in the class are globally distributed, and grow in soil and around roots. Specific known host trees of various Archaeorhizomyces species include hemlock, spruce, pine and heather, but other species colonise hardwoods generally.

The precise ecological role of the taxa is uncertain. While originally found to be seasonal, suggesting it was dependent on carbon compounds from the roots, when grown in culture, Archaeorhizomyces finlayi, was shown to be able to grow using either glucose or cellulose as its sole source of carbon, suggesting "that it may be involved in decomposition and not require direct carbon transfer from the plant through symbiosis". While the ecological role is not yet clear, preliminary tests suggest that the fungus is neither a pathogen nor an ectomycorrhizal symbiont.

Prior to the description by Rosling and colleagues, Archaeorhizomycetes was referred to as Soil Clone Group 1 or SCGI after it was originally discovered tundra soils and reported in 2003 by Schadt et al. The taxa were only known from ribosomal DNA sequencing but it had been found independently in ecological studies of soil in more than fifty cases worldwide using three different gene regions. However, neither fruit bodies nor spores had been observed.

Archaeorhizomyces finlayi, (named in honour of Roger D. Finlay) was the first species described. It is known from Scandinavia and North America. A second species Archaeorhizomyces borealis was described in 2014 together with an estimate that the class may consist of close to 500 species based on sequences available in public databases.

References 

Ascomycota
Taxa described in 2011
Fungi of Europe
Fungi of North America
Fungus classes
Monotypic fungus taxa